Piruro (possibly from Quechua for whorl) is an archaeological site in Peru. It is situated in the Huánuco Region, Huamalíes Province, Tantamayo District. The site was declared a National Cultural Heritage by Resolución Directoral No. 533/INC on June 18, 2002.

The complex consists of two parts named Piruro I and Piruro II.  This archaeological zone has had a long occupation, its first vestiges date from 3000 to 2500 years B.C (Final Preceramic) and they extend until the Inca Empire (Late Horizon).

The Fortress of Piruro II can be found in the right side of the river Tantamayo over 3.8 km over the sea level, the first archaeological inspections of the fortress happened during the explorations of Bertrand Flornov around the years 1957 and 1975 and excavations are attributed to Lois Girault between the years 1968 and 1970, the carbon dating from those examinations give a date between 1930 and 2100 years B.C. meaning this fortress was built in the pre-ceramic period, Girault found architectonic remnants of hewn stones that seem similar to those found in Kotosh and certain walls located in Chavin. The fortress is composed of walls build with stones hewn in squared shape and uniform size. The building is composed of 5 floors, where the front of it has rectangular doors and windows. In the front of the building there is a large-scale clearance that shapes a park because in the center of it there are remnants of a stone and mud structure covered by the ground. Currently the building is fenced by stone walls of 1 1/2 meters in height were two rectangular doors protrude, there also is a 4-meter height stone tower near the place where some stones bulge in the backside of the structure that were used as a makeshift ladder.

See also 
 Anku
 Isog
 Susupillo
 Huankarán
 Andean preceramic
 Kotosh Religious Tradition

References 

Archaeological sites in Huánuco Region
Archaeological sites in Peru